Dominique Sanders (born 16 August 1957) is a former French racing cyclist. He rode in three editions of the Tour de France between 1978 and 1980.

References

External links
 

1957 births
Living people
French male cyclists
Sportspeople from Haute-Garonne
Cyclists from Occitania (administrative region)
21st-century French people
20th-century French people